Selnica is a village in Zagorje, northern Croatia.

References

Populated places in Krapina-Zagorje County